Salt Mobile SA (officially stylized as Salt.) is a Swiss telecommunications provider focusing on mobile telephony and fiber-optic land-line services. It operates the third-largest mobile network in the country, with 17% market share.

The merger with Sunrise Communications AG was prohibited by the Swiss competition authority Weko in April 2010. Salt began as the Swiss subsidiary of Orange S.A. Later, in 2012, it was sold to the British investment company, Apax Partners. It continued to license and operate under the Orange name until 2015, when the company was sold by Apax Partners to NJJ Capital of Xavier Niel and the Salt brand launched.

References

Telecommunications companies of Switzerland